Antoing is a city and municipality of Wallonia located in the province of Hainaut, Belgium. 

The municipality consists of the following districts: Antoing, Bruyelle, Calonne, Fontenoy, Maubray, and Péronnes-lez-Antoing.

History
The Battle of Fontenoy, a major battle in the War of Austrian Succession, was fought near Fontenoy on 11 May 1745.

Places of interest
 Antoing Castle, originally from the 12th century, restored by Eugène Viollet-le-Duc in the 19th century

Famous inhabitants
Raoul Cauvin, comics writer, was born in Antoing in 1938

References

External links
 

Cities in Wallonia
Municipalities of Hainaut (province)